USU Software AG is headquartered in Möglingen, Germany, and is a holding company for various subsidiaries that operate as international software and service companies. The company focuses primarily on digitalizing IT and customer services. 

In fiscal year 2021, the group generated revenue of €111.9 million with a total of 750 employees. Its net profit for the same year was €6.8 million. USU Software AG has branches in Germany, United States, France, Italy, Japan, Austria and the Czech Republic. It is listed in the Prime Segment of the Frankfurt Stock Exchange (Frankfurt, Germany).

Company history
USU was founded in 1977 as Udo Strehl Unternehmensberatung
and is headquartered in Möglingen near Stuttgart, Germany. The company has worked in the area of IT management since 1988. One further focus since 1995 has been knowledge management. The company was floated on July 4, 2000. It took over OMEGA GmbH in 2005, LeuTek GmbH in 2006, and Aspera GmbH in 2010 to expand its product portfolio. The USU Group took a majority stake in BIG Social Media GmbH, Berlin, at the end of 2012. Aspera Technologies Inc. was founded in Boston in 2013. A new Industrial Big Data research unit was also established in 2013. SecurIntegration GmbH, Cologne, a company that specializes in SAP license management, was acquired in mid-2015. It was merged with Aspera GmbH in 2016. At the beginning of 2017, unitb technologies GmbH, a full-service agency for digital media and IT, became a member of the USU Group. In May 2017, EASYTRUST SAS became the first French company to be acquired by the group. EASYTRUST, which was renamed as USU SAS at the end of 2017, specializes in data center inventory and Oracle license management. 

In spring 2018, the subsidiary USU AG changed its legal form and has been operating under the name USU GmbH. unymira, a new business segment of USU GmbH, was created in 2018. It focuses on digitizing business processes in service and bundles the portfolio of the four previously independent USU divisions BIG Social Media, Business Solutions, KCenter and unitb technology. 

On January 28,2021, the USU Group announces it would unit all of its subsidiaries under the common USU umbrella brand. As part of the new branding, Aspera GmbH operates under USU Technologies GmbH, Aspera Inc. in the United States under USU Solutions Inc. and LeuTek GmbH under USU Solutions GmbH. USU GmbH will continue to exist as a legal unit and is divided into the areas of Service Management (previously Valuemation), Digital Services & Solutions and Knowledge Management (previously unymira). The group company USU Software AG, USU SAS in France, and the development company USU Software in the Czech Republic also remain unchanged. 

The USU Group has more than 1200 customers, including Allianz, BASF, BMW Group, Deutsche Telekom, E.ON, Orange, Poste Italiane and Volkswagen.

Products 
USU offers software and services for IT and customer service management worldwide.

References

Software companies of Germany
Knowledge management
IT service management
Chatbots